is a Japanese television drama series. It premiered on TBS on January 12, 2012. The drama revolves around the members of the Ihara family who operate a funeral parlor in Tokyo.

Show Synopsis
The funeral parlor  has been run by Ihara Masato’s (Tomohisa Yamashita) family for generations. Masato grows to hate the family business due to the teasing he suffers from for being "the undertaker's kid", and he leaves home early in life. The sudden death of his estranged father and the disappearance of his older brother Kento (Takashi Sorimachi) leave the Ihara-ya in Masato's reluctant hands.

The Ihara-ya has close ties with the police and mostly handles the bodies of people who have died under mysterious or unexplained circumstances. On occasions, when the police simply classify the deaths as accidental, Masato tries to find out the truth for the sake of the surviving family, even though he knows that he is being meddlesome.

Masato ends up dealing with these silent bodies, the painful reasons behind their deaths, and the harsh realities of the world together with rookie detective Sakamaki Yuki (Nana Eikura). As he does so, he starts to face up to his own life and family.

Cast

Crew
 Screenwriter: Chiho Watanabe
 Directors: Yasuharu Ishii, Ryutaro Kawashima, Yamamuro Daisuke
 Producer: Hidenori Iyoda

Episodes

References

External links 

2012 Japanese television series debuts
Japanese drama television series
TBS Television (Japan) dramas